This is a partial list of craters on Mars. There are hundreds of thousands of impact craters on Mars, but only some of them have names. This list here only contains named Martian craters starting with the letter H – N (see also lists for A – G and O – Z).

Large Martian craters (greater than 60 kilometers in diameter) are named after famous scientists and science fiction authors; smaller ones (less than 60 km in diameter) get their names from towns on Earth. Craters cannot be named for living people, and small crater names are not intended to be commemorative – that is, a small crater isn't named after a specific town on Earth, but rather its name comes at random from a pool of terrestrial place names, with some exceptions made for craters near landing sites. Latitude and longitude are given as planetographic coordinates with west longitude.

H

back to top

I

back to top

J

back to top

K

back to top

L

back to top

M

back to top

N

back to top

See also 
 List of catenae on Mars
 List of craters on Mars
 List of mountains on Mars

References

External links 
 USGS: Martian system nomenclature
 USGS: Mars Nomenclature: Craters

Mars: H-N